JWD InfoLogistics Public Company Limited (JWD) is logistics and supply chain service provider in Thailand and ASEAN countries.

History 

JWD InfoLogistics started its business with home and office moving services under the name of JVK International Movers Company Limited in 1979. The company later expanded its portfolio of business into the logistics and supply chain industry and converted into a public company and listed in the Stock Exchange of Thailand on September 29, 2015. JWD Group decided to cooperate with Flash Group and Thailand Post to launch the Cold Chain Express named Fuze Post on September 1, 2021.

Organization 

JWD and its subsidiaries handle logistics operations including land transport, warehouse and supply chain management, IT solutions for logistics and investment. Its main service is warehouse and yard management, which contributes more than 50 percent of revenue. It specializes in three product areas: automotive and parts, cold chain logistics, and dangerous goods & chemicals. It handles approximately 70% of hazardous substances flowing through the ports of the Port Authority of Thailand.

Awards 
JWD received the Thailand Sustainability Investment (THSI) award in 2018, 2019, 2020 and 2021 The award is granted to the listed companies with excellent performance in corporate governance and social responsibility.

References

External links
 
 Reuters - JWD Key Developments

Logistics companies of Thailand
Companies based in Bangkok
Companies listed on the Stock Exchange of Thailand
1979 establishments in Thailand
Companies established in 1979